Samuel Bell (6 February 1909 – 1982) was a professional footballer who played for Burnhope Institution, Norwich City, Luton Town, Tottenham Hotspur, Southend United, Millwall and Tonbridge.

Football career 
Bell played for local club Burnhope Institution before signing for Norwich City. The forward played 76 matches and scored on 26 occasions for the Canaries between 1930–33. In 1933 he joined Luton Town where he made a further 30 appearances and scoring 20 goals. Bell moved to White Hart Lane club Tottenham Hotspur where he participated in 16 games and scoring six goals in all competitions between 1934–36. He signed for Southend United in 1937 and featured in 71 matches and found the net on 17 occasions. After the hostilities of World War II had ended he went on to play for Millwall and finally Tonbridge.

References 

1909 births
1982 deaths
Footballers from County Durham
English footballers
Association football forwards
Norwich City F.C. players
Luton Town F.C. players
Tottenham Hotspur F.C. players
Southend United F.C. players
Millwall F.C. players
Tonbridge Angels F.C. players
English Football League players